Ojarud may refer to:
Ojarud-e Gharbi Rural District
Ojarud-e Markazi Rural District
Ojarud-e Sharqi Rural District
Ojarud-e Shomali Rural District